The 2020 Guangzhou Evergrande Taobao season is the 67th year in Guangzhou Evergrande's existence and its 53rd season in the Chinese football league, also its 31st season in the top flight.

Transfers

In

Winter

Out

Winter

Pre-season and friendlies

Training matches

Competitions

Chinese Super League

Regular season

Table

Results by round

Matches

Championship stage

Quarter-finals 

Guangzhou Evergrande Taobao won 8–1 on aggregate.

Semi-finals 

Guangzhou Evergrande Taobao won 3–1 on aggregate.

Final 

Guangzhou Evergrande Taobao lost 1–2 on aggregate.

Chinese FA Cup

Chinese FA Super Cup

AFC Champions League

Group stage

Statistics

Appearances and goals

Goalscorers

Disciplinary record

References 

Guangzhou F.C.
Guangzhou F.C. seasons